Farhad Fatkullin (born 2 November 1979) is a Russian social activist from Tatarstan best known for his activities in promoting the Wikimedia movement among non-Russian speaking peoples of Russian Federation. For that, he was declared Wikimedian of the Year 2018. Generally, he is a professional simultaneous interpreter previously serving for the former President of Tatarstan Mintimer Shaimiev.

Biography 

Fatkullin was born on November 2, 1979, in Kazan. He is married, with two children.

Education 

 1986–1993: Kazan High school No.123 with in-depth study of French language.
 1993–1997: Ertugrul Gazi Tatar-Turkish high school, Kazan.
 1995–1997: Clayton High School, Missouri, USA.
 1997–2002: Kazan State Finance and Economics Institute, Economy of Enterprise—Finance management.
 2004–2008: Institute of Social and Humanitarian Knowledge, Kazan, faculty of interpretation.

Speaks Tatar, Russian, English, French, Turkish, Italian.

Professional activities 
Teacher of "Risk Management" (in English) at Kazan State Finance and Economics Institute (Russia) and State University of New York at Canton (USA).

Interpreter of translation sector, State Protocol Department of the Republic of Tatarstan Presidential Administration.

Has a lengthy record of many other translation activities at numerous political, educational, cultural and business events.

In 2020, he was included by President of Tatarstan Rustam Minnikhanov into the Commission for Preservation and Development of the Tatar language consisting of 35 high-profile language and culture specialists.

Current Wikimedia projects 

 Selet WikiSchool
 Smart region
 Wikimedia Community of Tatar language User Group
 Wikimedia Russia

Farhad is involved in a large number of volunteering initiatives related to global Wikimedia movement and to development of Wikipedias in languages of Russia. In 2018, at the moment his Wikimedian of the Year award was announced by Jimmy Wales at Wikimania in Cape Town, Farhad was busy at home simultaneously translating live broadcast from Wikimania for Russian Wikipedians (without knowing he was going to be awarded).

References

Interviews in English 
 2018 Wikimedian of the Year, Farkhad Fatkullin — Wikipedia Signpost, August 30, 2018
 
 Set of video interviews on Facebook (August 17, 2018)
 Farhad Fatkullin, 2018 Wikimedian of the Year, looks back on his successes and forward to what’s next — Wikmedia News, August, 14 2019

External links 

 Personal website in English
 Professional website in Russian

Living people
1979 births
Wikimedians of the Year
People from Kazan
Russian translators
21st-century translators
Russian Wikimedians